Pithecopus oreades is a species of frog in the subfamily Phyllomedusinae. It is endemic to Brazil and is known from the states of Goiás and Minas Gerais as well as from the Federal District. 

Breeding takes place in small streams and the tadpoles develop in pools within the streams. Threats to this species are unknown.

P. oreades skin secretions research has suggested therapeutic value, especially as an anti-Trypanosoma cruzi agent to prevent infections during blood transfusion.

References

oreades
Frogs of South America
Amphibians of Brazil
Endemic fauna of Brazil
Amphibians described in 2002
Taxonomy articles created by Polbot